Michael Carlsson (born 31 May 1972) is a Swedish bandy manager and former player (forward) and who currently manages Västerås SK. Carlsson was a youth product of Västerås SK and was spotted where he has stayed for his career apart from one year when he played in Russia for Vodnik. Carlsson has played for the Swedish national bandy team. In April 2019, he was appointed coach for the Swedish men's national team.

Career

Club career
Carlsson has represented Västerås SK, Vodnik, Köpings IS.

International career
Carlsson was part of Swedish World Champions teams of 2003

Honours

Country 
 Sweden
 Bandy World Championship: 2003

References

External links
 

1972 births
Living people
Swedish bandy players
Swedish bandy managers
Expatriate bandy players in Russia
Swedish expatriate sportspeople in Russia
Västerås SK Bandy players
Vodnik Arkhangelsk players
Västerås SK Bandy managers
Sweden international bandy players
Bandy World Championship-winning players